William James Clappison (born 14 September 1956), commonly known as James Clappison, is a British barrister and Conservative Party politician. He serves as Vice Chairman of the Conservative Friends of Israel group.

Personal life
The son of a Yorkshire farmer, Clappison was born in Beverley, East Riding of Yorkshire and educated at the independent St Peter's School, York, before attending The Queen's College, Oxford where he graduated with a Bachelor of Arts degree in Philosophy, Politics and Economics in 1978. While at Oxford he was a member of the Oxford University Conservative Association and was elected to the presidency of the Junior Common Room of his college. In 1981 he was called to the Bar from Gray's Inn and has been a practising barrister since then.

Clappison married Helen Margherita Carter in July 1984 in Leeds and they have a son (born in March 1987) and three daughters (born April 1985, August 1989 and April 1995).

Parliamentary career
He contested the safe Labour parliamentary seat of Barnsley East at the 1987 general election where he came second, some 23,511 votes behind Terry Patchett. He also contested the Yorkshire South European Parliament seat at the Euro elections of 1989. He was selected to fight the May 1990 Bootle by-election following the death of Allan Roberts. He was defeated by Mike Carr by 23,517 votes. Carr served as the Labour MP for Bootle for just 57 days before he died of a heart attack on 20 July 1990. Clappison contested Bootle again at the November by-election where he was defeated heavily once more by the new Labour candidate Joe Benton to the tune of 19,465 votes. He was rewarded for his efforts by securing the nomination for the safe Conservative seat of Hertsmere, which became vacant on the retirement of Cecil Parkinson. James Clappison was safely elected at the 1992 general election with a majority of 18,735. He made his maiden speech on 19 May 1992, during which he spoke of the organised crimes and anti-Semitism against his Jewish constituents.

On his election he became the Parliamentary Private Secretary to Emily Blatch at the Department of Education, and from 1994 at the Home Office. He was promoted to government by John Major in 1995 as the Parliamentary Under Secretary of State at the Department for the Environment until the defeat of the Major government at the 1997 general election. After the 1997 general election, Clappison served as a Shadow Home Office Minister, before being moved to Education and Employment by William Hague in 1999 and then to be a Shadow Treasury Minister in 2000. Under the leadership of Iain Duncan Smith he was a Shadow Work and Pensions Minister until he left the frontbench in 2002. He served as a member of the Home Affairs Select committee afterwards. He was Shadow Work and Pensions Minister again until the 2010 general election.

During the Parliamentary expenses scandal in 2009, Clappison was criticised for claiming over £100,000 in expenses on a second home whilst owning 24 properties in total, though only £38.50 of this was found to have been improperly claimed, which he claimed was an "honest mistake"

In 2014, Clappison announced that he would be standing down as an MP in 2015.

References

External links
 Guardian Unlimited Politics - Ask Aristotle: James Clappison MP
 TheyWorkForYou.com - James Clappison MP
 The Public Whip - James Clappison MP voting record
 BBC News - James Clappison  profile 10 February 2005

News items
 Arguing with David Miliband over the Reform Treaty in October 2007

1956 births
Living people
Conservative Party (UK) MPs for English constituencies
UK MPs 1992–1997
UK MPs 1997–2001
UK MPs 2001–2005
UK MPs 2005–2010
UK MPs 2010–2015
People educated at St Peter's School, York
Alumni of The Queen's College, Oxford